NGC 4424 is a spiral galaxy located in the equatorial constellation of Virgo. It was discovered February 27, 1865 by German astronomer Heinrich Louis d'Arrest. This galaxy is located at a distance of 13.5 million light years and is receding with a heliocentric radial velocity of 442 km/s. It has a morphological class of SB(s)a, which normally indicates a spiral galaxy with a barred structure (SB), no inner ring feature (s), and tightly-wound spiral arms (a). The galactic plane is inclined at an angle of 62° to the line of sight from the Earth. It is a likely member of the Virgo Cluster of galaxies.

The galaxy NGC 4424 has a peculiar morphology with shells that give the appearance of a galaxy merger within the last half billion years. It has a long tail of hydrogen stretching  to the south that is likely due to stripping from ram pressure. Because of the lack of gas, star formation has completely ceased in the outer parts of the galaxy, while there is still a mild amount occurring in the inner region. NGC 4424 will most likely end up as a lenticular galaxy by three billion years from now.

There is no indication of a compact source of X-ray emission in the nucleus, but there is an ionized tail stretching  from the core. This is probably the core of a captured galaxy. It contains a compact source that is emitting X-rays and may be an active massive black hole. In time this may merge with the core SMBH of NGC 4424.

A Type Ia supernova designated SN 2012cg was discovered in this galaxy by the LOSS program from images taken May 17, 2012. It reached maximum light nine days later at the end of May. The available observations favor a merger of double degenerate progenitors as the source for the event. The proximity of the galaxy made this one of the best studied supernova explosions to date.

References

External links
 

Spiral galaxies
Peculiar galaxies
4424
07561
040809
Virgo (constellation)